Nemanja Crnoglavac (Serbian Cyrillic: Немања Црноглавац; born 13 January 1990) is a Serbian footballer who plays as a defender for Teleoptik.

Club career
Crnoglavac started his career with Zemun in the 2007–08 season. He also played for Spartak Subotica, Teleoptik and Hajduk Kula.

International career
Crnoglavac represented Serbia at the 2009 UEFA Under-19 Championship.

Notes and references

External links
 UEFA profile
 
 Srbijafudbal profile

1990 births
Living people
Association football defenders
FK Hajduk Kula players
FK Spartak Subotica players
FK Teleoptik players
FK Zemun players
Serbian footballers
Serbia youth international footballers
Serbian SuperLiga players
Footballers from Belgrade